The 1960 Atlantic hurricane season was the least active season since 1952. The season officially began on June 15, and lasted until November 15. These dates conventionally delimit the period of each year when most tropical cyclones form in the Atlantic basin. The first system, an unnamed storm, developed in the Bay of Campeche on June 22. It brought severe local flooding to southeastern Texas and was considered the worst disaster in some towns since a Hurricane in 1945. The unnamed storm moved across the United States for almost a week before dissipating on June 29. In July, Hurricane Abby resulted in minor damage in the Leeward Islands, before impacting a few Central American counties — the remnants of the storm would go on to form Hurricane Celeste in the East Pacific. Later that month, Tropical Storm Brenda caused flooding across much of the East Coast of the United States. The next storm, Hurricane Cleo, caused no known impact, despite its close proximity to land.

The most significant storm of the season was Hurricane Donna, which at the time was among the ten costliest United States hurricanes. After the precursor caused a deadly plane crash in Senegal, the storm itself brought severe flooding and wind impacts to the Lesser Antilles and Florida, where Donna made landfall as a Category 4 hurricane. It moved northeast and struck North Carolina and Long Island, New York, while still at hurricane intensity. Donna caused at least 428 fatalities and $980 million (1960 USD) in damage. Hurricane Ethel reached Category 3 intensity, but rapidly weakened before making landfall in Mississippi, resulting in only 1 fatality and $1.5 million in losses. The final storm, Florence, developed on September 17. It remained weakened and moved erratically over Cuba and Florida. Only minor flooding was reported. Collectively, the tropical cyclones in 1960 caused at least 454 deaths and about $990.74 million in damage.

Season summary 

The Atlantic hurricane season officially began on June 15, 1960. It was a below-average season in which seven tropical depressions formed. All seven of the depressions attained tropical storm status, which was below the 1950–2000 average of 9.6 named storms. Four of these reached hurricane status, also falling short of the 1950–2000 average of 5.9. Furthermore, two storms reached major hurricane status, which is Category 3 or higher on the Saffir–Simpson hurricane wind scale. Two hurricane and four tropical storms made landfall during the season and caused 454 deaths and $410.74 million (1960 USD) in damage.

Season activity began on June 23, with the development of an unnamed tropical storm. Tropical cyclogenesis resumed in July with Hurricane Abby between July 10 and July 16, followed by Tropical Storm Brenda from July 28 to July 31. In mid-August, Hurricane Cleo developed and had an uneventful duration. At the end of that month, Hurricane Donna formed and lasted into mid-September; it was the strongest tropical cyclone of the season, peaking as a Category 4 hurricane. There was a Category 3 hurricane in September, Ethel, which briefly existed in the Gulf of Mexico. The last storm of the season, Tropical Storm Florence, dissipated on September 25, over a month before the official end of the season on November 15.

The season's activity was reflected with an accumulated cyclone energy (ACE) rating of 73 units, the lowest value since 1956. ACE is, broadly speaking, a measure of the power of the hurricane multiplied by the length of time it existed, so storms that last a long time, as well as particularly strong hurricanes, have high ACEs. It is only calculated for full advisories on tropical systems at or exceeding  or tropical storm strength.

Systems

Tropical Storm One 

Because no circulation was reported, it was operationally classified as a tropical low, though radar stations along the Gulf Coast of Mexico indicated a circulation. Thus, the system became a tropical depression at 0600 UTC on June 22, while located in the Bay of Campeche. The depression strengthened and was estimated to have become a tropical storm on June 23. Later that day, it made landfall near Corpus Christi, Texas at the same intensity. The storm weakened slowly and moved across the Central United States, before dissipating over Illinois on June 28.

Thus considerable flooding occurred in some areas of south and eastern Texas. Throughout the state, more than 150 houses sustained flood damage in several counties. In addition, numerous major highways were closed, including portions of U.S. Routes 59, 87, 90, and 185, and Texas State Highways 35 and 71. In Arkansas, a few buildings in Hot Springs were damaged from high winds. Elsewhere, light to moderate rainfall was recorded in at least 11 other states, though damage was minimal. The storm was the rainiest tropical cyclone on record in the state of Kentucky, dropping  in Dunmor. Overall, the storm was attributed to 15 fatalities and $3.6 million in damage.

Hurricane Abby 

A tropical wave developed into a tropical depression near the Windward Islands on July 10. Abby tracked westward across the Caribbean Sea with little change in intensity. Later that day, Hurricane Abby made landfall in southern British Honduras (present day Belize). Abby quickly weakened inland, moving across Guatemala and coastal Mexico. On July 17, Abby dissipated over the Mexican state of Veracruz. However, the remnants later contributed to the development of Hurricane Celeste in the eastern Pacific.

Six people died when a roof of a house collapsed. Damage in St. Lucia reached $435,000, most of which was incurred to banana and coconut crops. The resultant landslides from the precipitation extensively impacted roads and bridges. Damage in British Honduras was light, with about $40,500 in losses, mostly to agriculture.

Tropical Storm Brenda 

A weak low-pressure area in the Gulf of Mexico developed on July 26, organizing into Tropical Storm Brenda a day later. The minimal tropical storm moved ashore near Cross City, Florida on July 29, and moved northeastward along the east coast of the United States, gradually intensifying despite being largely over land. After moving through the Mid-Atlantic states and New England, Brenda transitioned into an extratropical cyclone on July 31 over Maine. The remnants of Brenda interacted with another extratropical storm over eastern Canada before absorbing it. For about a week, the remnants of Brenda drifted and executed a large loop over northern Quebec, Labrador, and adjacent waters, eventually dissipating on August 7.

Brenda was considered the worst storm to strike West Central Florida since Hurricane Easy in 1950. While no casualties are directly blamed on the storm, at least one traffic-related death took place. According to an American Red Cross Disaster Service report encompassing eight Florida counties, 11 houses sustained significant damage, while 567 suffered more minor damage. Around 590 families were affected overall. Total monetary damage in Florida is placed at nearly $5 million. Further north, other states reported strong winds and locally heavy rainfall, though no significant damage occurred.

Hurricane Cleo 

A strong tropical wave produced rainfall and gusty winds in The Bahamas and the Greater Antilles in mid-August. The wave was closely monitored for possible tropical cyclogenesis and special bulletins were issued by the United States Weather Bureau. At 1800 UTC on August 17, Tropical Storm Cleo developed near Cat Island in The Bahamas. The storm headed northeastward and immediately began to intensify. Operationally, the United States Weather Bureau at the hurricane warning center in Miami did not initiate advisories on Cleo until 1500 UTC on August 18. Sustained winds were already  at the time, as recorded by a reconnaissance aircraft flight. By 1800 UTC on August 18, Cleo strengthened into a hurricane.

Throughout its duration, Cleo remained a relatively small tropical cyclone. Because the storm posed a significant threat to New England, a "hurricane watch" was issued for southeastern Massachusetts and Rhode Island on August 19. Various gale warnings were also put into effect from Block Island, Rhode Island, to Portland, Maine. However, this was unnecessary because Cleo remained well offshore. Cleo curved east-northeastward on August 20, remaining south of Nova Scotia, until it dissipated a day later.

Hurricane Donna 

A tropical wave in west Africa, blamed for 63 deaths in a plane crash in Senegal, developed into a tropical depression south of Cape Verde late on August 29. The depression strengthened into Tropical Storm Donna by the following day. Significant deepening occurred during the next 30 hours, with Donna being a moderate Category 4 hurricane by late on September 2. Thereafter, it weakened some and brushed the Lesser Antilles later that day. On Saint Maarten, the storm left a quarter of the island homeless and killed 7 people. An additional 5 deaths were reported in Anguilla and there were 7 other deaths throughout the Virgin Islands. In Puerto Rico, severe flash flooding led to 107 fatalities, 85 of them in Humacao alone. Donna further weakened to a Category 3 hurricane late on September 5, but eventually became a Category 4 hurricane again. While passing through The Bahamas, several small island communities in the central regions of the country were leveled, but no damage total or fatalities were reported.

Florida bore the brunt of Hurricane Donna. In the Florida Keys, coastal flooding severely damaged 75% of buildings, destroyed several subdivisions in Marathon. On the mainland, 5,200 houses were impacted, which does not include the 75% of homes damaged at Fort Myers Beach; 50% of buildings were also destroyed in the city of Everglades. Crop losses were also extensive. A total of 50% of grapefruit crop was lost, 10% of the orange and tangerine crop was lost, and the avocado crop was almost completely destroyed. In the state of Florida alone, there were 13 deaths and $300 million in losses. Donna weakened over Florida and was a Category 2 hurricane when it re-emerged into the Atlantic from North Florida. Additionally, storm surge caused significant beach erosion and structural damage Wilmington and Nags Head. There were 8 deaths and over 100 injuries. Later on September 12, Donna reemerged into the Atlantic Ocean and continued to move northeastward. The storm struck Long Island, New York late on September 12 and rapidly weakened inland. On the following day, Donna became extratropical over Maine.

Tropical Storm Six 

For several days, a weak low pressure area moved across the tropical Atlantic, which organized into a tropical storm on September 1 to the northeast of the Lesser Antilles. The storm moved northward and weakened. On September 3, the system was absorbed by an approaching cold front. The storm was added to the Atlantic hurricane database in 2016.

Hurricane Ethel 

A trough was located over the Gulf of Mexico on September 8, which interacted with a weakening cold front to produce a low pressure area, and eventually a tropical depression on September 12. On the next day, the system intensified into Tropical Storm Ethel, which began a period of rapid intensification a day later. By late on September 14, Ethel reached peak winds of 115 mph (185 km), presenting a well-defined eye. The storm gradually weakened after moving inland, before eventually dissipating over southern Kentucky on September 17.

In Louisiana, the outer bands of the storm produced light rainfall and hurricane-force winds, though no damage was reported in that state. Offshore Mississippi, rough seas inundated Horn Island and split Ship Island. Tropical storm force winds in the southern portion of the state littered broken glass, trees, and signs across streets in Pascagoula, as well as down power lines, which caused some residents to lose power. In Alabama, winds damaged beach cottages along the Gulf Coast, and damaged crops in the southern portion of the state. A lightning strike to a power station near Tallahassee caused a brief citywide blackout. The storm spawned four tornadoes in Florida, one of which destroyed 25 homes. Outside the Gulf Coast of the United States, rain fell in eight others states, but no damage is known to have occurred. Overall, Ethel caused one fatality and $1.5 million in losses.

Tropical Storm Florence 

A westward moving tropical wave developed into a tropical depression while located north of Puerto Rico on September 17. By the following day, the depression strengthened into Tropical Storm Florence. Later on September 18, Florence peaked as a  tropical storm as it approached The Bahamas. However, unfavorable conditions weakened the storm back to a tropical depression on September 19. On September 21, Florence lost its surface circulation, and the disturbance executed a small cyclonic loop over Cuba. On September 23, the system redeveloped its surface center, and it became a tropical depression again, moving ashore Monroe County, Florida that day. The storm turned back to the west-northwest and weakened again to a tropical depression. Florence moved across the northeastern Gulf of Mexico, moving ashore again near the Alabama-Florida border on September 26, and dissipating soon after.

On Grand Bahama,  of rain fell in only 6 hours. The storm dropped rainfall across Florida, though the heavier amounts were mainly on the Atlantic coast. Precipitation peaked at  near Fellsmere, while rainfall reached  in some areas of the Miami metropolitan area. In Jacksonville, a pressure gradient combined with Florida to produce tides of  about normal.

Storm names 
The following names were used for named storms (tropical storms and hurricanes) that formed in the North Atlantic in 1960. Storms were named Abby and Donna for the first time in 1960.

Retirement 

Following the season, the name Donna was retired, replaced with Dora.

Season effects 
The following table lists all of the storms that have formed in the 1960 Atlantic hurricane season. It includes their duration, names, landfall(s) (in parentheses), damages, and death totals. Deaths in parentheses are additional and indirect (an example of an indirect death would be a traffic accident), but were still related to that storm. Damage and deaths include totals while the storm was extratropical, a wave, or a low, and all of the damage figures are in 1960 USD.

See also 

 1960 North Indian Ocean cyclone season
 1960 Pacific hurricane season
 1960 Pacific typhoon season
 Atlantic hurricane season
 Lists of Atlantic hurricanes
 Australian region cyclone seasons: 1959–60 1960–61
 South Pacific cyclone seasons: 1959–60 1960–61
 South-West Indian Ocean cyclone seasons: 1959–60 1960–61

References

External links 
 Monthly Weather Review

 
Articles which contain graphical timelines